Oakland City is the third-largest city in Gibson County, Indiana, United States, after Princeton and Fort Branch. It is the site of Oakland City University. The population was 2,279 at the 2020 census.

History
Oakland City was laid out and platted in 1856. It was probably named for the presence of oak trees. The Oakland City post office was established in 1860.

The William M. Cockrum House was listed on the National Register of Historic Places in 1978.

Geography
Oakland City is located at  (38.337953, -87.347356).

Demographics

2010 census
At the 2010 census, there were 2,429 people, 973 households and 568 families living in the city. The racial make-up was 97.2% White, 0.4% African American, 0.2% Native American, 0.6% Asian, 0.5% from other races, and 1.1% from two or more races. Hispanic or Latino of any race were 2.0% of the population.

There were 973 households, of which 28.9% had children under the age of 18 living with them, 39.4% were married couples living together, 12.6% had a female householder with no husband present, 6.4% had a male householder with no wife present, and 41.6% were non-families. 37.0% of all households were made up of individuals, and 17.5% had someone living alone who was 65 years of age or older. The average household size was 2.22 and the average family size was 2.86.

The median age was 36.1 years. 20.6% of residents were under the age of 18, 16.3% were between the ages of 18 and 24, 21.7% were from 25 to 44, 23.8% were from 45 to 64 and 17.5% were 65 years of age or older. The sex make-up of the city was 47.2% male and 52.8% female.

2000 census
At the 2000 census, there were 2,588 people, 1,031 households and 642 families living in the city. The racial make-up was 97.60% White, 0.73% African American, 0.19% Native American, 0.50% Asian, 0.43% from other races, and 0.54% from two or more races. Hispanic or Latino of any race were 1.55% of the population.

There were 1,031 households, of which 27.2% had children under the age of 18 living with them, 46.8% were married couples living together, 11.3% had a female householder with no husband present, and 37.7% were non-families. 35.0% of all households were made up of individuals, and 19.0% had someone living alone who was 65 years of age or older. The average household size was 2.23 and the average family size was 2.86.

20.6% of the opulation were under the age of 18, 16.3% from 18 to 24, 24.1% from 25 to 44, 19.2% from 45 to 64 and 19.8% were 65 years of age or older. The median age was 37 years. For every 100 females, there were 85.1 males. For every 100 females age 18 and over, there were 81.2 males.

The median household income was $28,532 and the median family income was $37,440. Males had a median income of $30,500 and females $24,602. The per capita income was $13,806. About 7.6% of families and 11.9% of the population were below the poverty line, including 14.1% of those under age 18 and 10.4% of those age 65 or over.

Education

Higher education
Oakland City is the site of Oakland City University, the only General Baptist-affiliated university, with a global campus providing over 40 degrees from associate, bachelor, master and doctorate studies and Oakland City University School of Adult and Extended Learning with programs that specialize in busy adult students. Oakland City University was established in 1885 as Oakland City College. It attained university status and changed its name in the latter part of the 20th century. Oakland City University sports teams are the Mighty Oaks.

K-12 education
Oakland City is headquarters of the East Gibson School Corporation. Oakland City Elementary School, Waldo J. Wood Memorial Junior High School and Waldo J. Wood Memorial High School are all located on South Franklin Street. The Oakland City Elementary sports teams are the Acorns (relating to the Oaks above). The Waldo J. Wood Memorial Junior High teams and Waldo J. Wood Memorial High School teams are the Trojans. Other schools in the East Gibson School Corporation are Barton Township Elementary School, located in Mackey, and Francisco Elementary School, located in Francisco.

Public library
The town has a lending library, the Oakland City-Columbia Township Public Library.

Notable people
 Gil Hodges, Brooklyn Dodgers first baseman, attended college at Oakland City College
 Edd Roush, Cincinnati Reds outfielder in Baseball Hall of Fame, was born in Oakland City.
Jeremy Spencer, Five Finger Death Punch drummer, was born in Oakland City.

References

 
1856 establishments in Indiana
Cities in Indiana
Cities in Gibson County, Indiana
Evansville metropolitan area
Communities of Southwestern Indiana
Populated places established in 1856